Raynald "Ray" Cooper Jr. is an American former fighter. During his career, he holds notable upset victories over Jake Shields, Antonio McKee, and Hermes Franca. A professional competitor for promotions in his native Hawaii and Shooto from 1997 until 2008. His son, Ray Cooper III, is also a professional fighter.

Mixed martial arts record

|-
| Loss
| align=center| 14–9
| Richie Whitson
| KO (punch)
| X-1: Legends
| 
| align=center| 1
| align=center| 3:54
| Honolulu, Hawaii, United States
| 
|-
| Win
| align=center| 14–8
| Koji Yoshida
| TKO (punches)
| ROTR 9: Rumble on the Rock 9
| 
| align=center| 1
| align=center| 2:47
| Honolulu, Hawaii, United States
| 
|-
| Loss
| align=center| 13–8
| Takashi Nakakura
| TKO (cut)
| Shooto: 5/4 in Korakuen Hall
| 
| align=center| 2
| align=center| 1:14
| Tokyo, Japan
| 
|-
| Win
| align=center| 13–7
| Hermes Franca
| KO (punches)
| Shooto Hawaii: Unleashed
| 
| align=center| 1
| align=center| 2:57
| Honolulu, Hawaii, United States
| 
|-
| Loss
| align=center| 12–7
| Jake Shields
| Submission (rear-naked choke)
| Shooto Hawaii: Soljah Fight Night
| 
| align=center| 1
| align=center| 3:29
| Honolulu, Hawaii, United States
| 
|-
| Loss
| align=center| 12–6
| Dennis Hallman
| Submission (guillotine choke)
| ROTR 4: Rumble on the Rock 4
| 
| align=center| 1
| align=center| 0:43
| Honolulu, Hawaii, United States
| 
|-
| Win
| align=center| 12–5
| Jason Buck
| Decision (unanimous)
| Shooto Hawaii: Alpha
| 
| align=center| 3
| align=center| 5:00
| Lahaina, Hawaii, United States
| 
|-
| Win
| align=center| 11–5
| Jake Shields
| Decision (majority)
| Warriors Quest 6: Best of the Best
| 
| align=center| 3
| align=center| 5:00
| Honolulu, Hawaii, United States
| 
|-
| Win
| align=center| 10–5
| Dan Gilbert
| Submission (punches)
| Warriors Quest 4: Genesis
| 
| align=center| 1
| align=center| 2:02
| Honolulu, Hawaii, United States
| 
|-
| Win
| align=center| 9–5
| Jeremy Bennett
| TKO (corner stoppage)
| Warriors Quest 3: Punishment in Paradise
| 
| align=center| 1
| align=center| 0:51
| Hawaii, United States
| 
|-
| Win
| align=center| 8–5
| Jeremy Williams
| TKO (strikes)
| Warriors Quest 2: Battle of Champions
| 
| align=center| 1
| align=center| 3:16
| United States
| 
|-
| Loss
| align=center| 7–5
| Tetsuji Kato
| Decision (unanimous)
| Shooto: To The Top 6
| 
| align=center| 3
| align=center| 5:00
| Tokyo, Japan
| 
|-
| Win
| align=center| 7–4
| Antonio McKee
| Submission (armbar)
| Warriors Quest 1: The New Beginning
| 
| align=center| 1
| align=center| 0:54
| Honolulu, Hawaii, United States
| 
|-
| Loss
| align=center| 6–4
| Paul Rodriguez
| Submission (armbar)
| SB 20: SuperBrawl 20
| 
| align=center| 1
| align=center| 1:55
| Honolulu, Hawaii, United States
| 
|-
| Loss
| align=center| 6–3
| Alex Cook
| Submission (neck crank)
| Shooto: R.E.A.D. Final
| 
| align=center| 1
| align=center| 1:44
| Urayasu, Chiba, Japan
| 
|-
| Loss
| align=center| 6–2
| Frank Trigg
| Submission (forearm choke)
| WEF: New Blood Conflict
| 
| align=center| 2
| align=center| 3:05
| 
| 
|-
| Win
| align=center| 6–1
| Jutaro Nakao
| Decision (unanimous)
| Shooto: R.E.A.D. 1
| 
| align=center| 3
| align=center| 5:00
| Tokyo, Japan
| 
|-
| Win
| align=center| 5–1
| Chris Kirby
| TKO (punches)
| SB 14: SuperBrawl 14
| 
| align=center| 1
| align=center| 1:34
| Guam
| 
|-
| Win
| align=center| 4–1
| Danny Bennett
| Submission (armbar)
| SB 13: SuperBrawl 13
| 
| align=center| 1
| align=center| 2:43
| Honolulu, Hawaii, United States
| 
|-
| Win
| align=center| 3–1
| Victor Hunsaker
| TKO (punches)
| SB 12: SuperBrawl 12
| 
| align=center| 1
| align=center| 0:46
| Honolulu, Hawaii, United States
| 
|-
| Loss
| align=center| 2–1
| Masanori Suda
| Submission (armbar)
| Shooto: Las Grandes Viajes 1
| 
| align=center| 1
| align=center| 1:55
| Tokyo, Japan
| 
|-
| Win
| align=center| 2–0
| Jason Nicholsen
| TKO (towel thrown from punches)
| SB 3: SuperBrawl 3
| 
| align=center| 1
| align=center| 0:28
| Honolulu, Hawaii, United States
| 
|-
| Win
| align=center| 1–0
| Taro Obata
| KO (punches)
| SB 3: SuperBrawl 3
| 
| align=center| 1
| align=center| 1:16
| Honolulu, Hawaii, United States
|

See also
List of male mixed martial artists

References

American male mixed martial artists
Lightweight mixed martial artists
Welterweight mixed martial artists
Middleweight mixed martial artists
Light heavyweight mixed martial artists
Living people
Mixed martial artists from Hawaii
Year of birth missing (living people)